Thioploca araucae is a marine thioploca from the benthos of the Chilean continental shelf. It is a colonial, multicellular, gliding trichomes of similar diameter enclosed by a shared sheath. It possesses cellular sulfur inclusions located in a thin peripheral cytoplasm surrounding a large, central vacuole. It is a motile organism through gliding. The trichome diameters of Thioploca araucae range from 30 to 43 μm.

References

Further reading
GALLARDO, VÍCTOR ARIEL, and CAROLA ESPINOZA. "BACTERIAS MARINAS GIGANTES."
Moreno, Rodrigo A., et al. "Pectinaria chilensis NILSSON, 1928 (POLYCHAETA: PECTINARIIDAE): taxonomic characterization, new distributional records and ecological notes from the chilean coast."INTERCIENCIA-CARACAS- 29 (2004): 590-594.
Gutiérrez, Dimitri, et al. "Oxygenation episodes on the continental shelf of central Peru: Remote forcing and benthic ecosystem response." Progress in Oceanography 79.2 (2008): 177–189.

Schulz, Heide N., et al. "Population study of the filamentous sulfur bacteria Thioploca spp. off the Bay of Concepción, Chile." Marine ecology. Progress series 200 (2000): 117–126.
Schulz, Heide N., et al. "Community structure of filamentous, sheath-building sulfur bacteria, Thioploca spp., off the coast of Chile." Applied and Environmental Microbiology 62.6 (1996): 1855–1862.

External links 
LPSN

Thiotrichales